Berta Alves de Sousa (8 April 1906 – 1 August 1997) was a Portuguese pianist and composer.

Biography
Candida Berta Alves de Sousa was born in Liège, Belgium. She grew up in Oporto, Portugal and studied music under Moreira de Sa, Luis Costa, Lucien Lambert and Claudio Carneyro at the Music Conservatory. She continued her studies in Paris with Wilhelm Backhaus and Theodor Szántó for piano and George Mingot for composition, and in Lisbon with Vianna da Motta. She also studied orchestral conducting with Clemens Krauss in Berlin and Pedro de Freitas Branco in Lisbon.

After completing her studies, Alves de Sousa took a position at the Music Conservatory of Oporto in 1946 teaching chamber music, (she later became chair) and performed as a concert pianist, accompanist and conductor. She also worked as a music critic for the newspaper O Primeiro de Janeiro in Porto. In 1941 she won the Prix de Sa Moreira established by Orpheon Portuense. Alves de Sousa died in Oporto, and her papers are held by the Oporto Conservatory of Music.

Works
Alves de Sousa composed chamber music, choral music and symphonic works. She also experimented with Symmetry Sonora, a method developed by composer Fernando Corrêa de Oliveira.

Selected works include:
Abreu Albano
Teixeira de Pascoaes
Há no Meu Peito uma Porta (In My Chest there is a Door)
Canção Marinha (Navy Song)
Três Prelúdios (Three Preludes)

Discography
Selected recordings include:
Compositores do Porto do Séc. XX, Canto e Piano
Numérica 1999, Sofia Lourenço, Compositores Portugueses Contemporâneos

References

External links

Further discography

1906 births
1997 deaths
Musicians from Porto
20th-century classical composers
Women classical composers
Portuguese women composers
Portuguese composers
20th-century women composers
Portuguese expatriates in Belgium